Christopher Middleton  ( – 12 February 1770) was a British navigator with the Hudson's Bay Company and Royal Navy officer. He was elected a Fellow of the Royal Society on 7 April 1737.

Career

Privateer in Queen Anne's War 
Middleton described serving aboard a privateer in Queen Anne's War. The war was fought between 1701 and 1713.

Hudson's Bay Company service
Middleton was appointed second mate of the Hannah, in 1721, and appointed her captain in 1725. He eventually made 16 annual voyages on ships supplying Hudson Bay Company outposts.

Middleton was a scientific sailor, and he methodically observed compass deviations, on his voyages. Hudson's Bay was close to the location of the North Magnetic Pole. Middleton published a paper, describing his observations, in the Royal Society's Philosophical Transactions. Middleton's scientific endeavours earned him a Fellowship in the Royal Society.

Northwest Passage 

<mapframe
text="Middleton's Northwest Passage expedition established Wager Bay was just a deep bay, not an outlet to the Pacific Ocean"
width=242
height=180
zoom=6
latitude=65.5
longitude=-89/>

In May, he left England on Furnace, accompanied by a smaller vessel, the purchased , under the command of William Moor, and sailed to Hudson Bay in search of a Northwest Passage.

He spent the winter at Fort Churchill, and then proceeded north, into Roes Welcome Sound and discovered Wager Inlet where he was iced in for three weeks. At the head of the sound he found himself blocked by ice, and named the place Repulse Bay.

Middleton returned to England in 1742, where he was presented with the Royal Society's Copley Medal, to whom he presented a paper entitled "The effects of cold; together with observations of the longitude, latitude, and declination of the magnetic needle, at Prince of Wales's fort, upon Churchill-River in Hudson's Bay, North America".

Royal Navy officers were entitled to half-pay when not employed, and Middleton spent the rest of his life on half-pay. He went back to the Hudson's Bay Company and requested a command, without success.

See also 
 Arthur Dobbs

References

Footnotes

Bibliography

External links 
 
 
 "Christopher Middleton, North-West Passage expedition, 1741–42" at Royal Museums Greenwich

18th-century English people
18th-century Royal Navy personnel
1690s births
1770 deaths
Date of birth uncertain
English explorers of North America
English navigators
English polar explorers
Explorers of Canada
Explorers of the Arctic
Fellows of the Royal Society
Hudson's Bay Company people
People from the Borough of Hartlepool
Recipients of the Copley Medal
Royal Navy officers